The southern litter skink (Caledoniscincus notialis) is a species of lizard in the family Scincidae. It is endemic to New Caledonia.

References

Caledoniscincus
Skinks of New Caledonia
Endemic fauna of New Caledonia
Reptiles described in 2013
Taxa named by Ross Allen Sadlier
Taxa named by Sarah A. Smith
Taxa named by Aaron M. Bauer
Taxa named by Perry L. Wood